Loïc Cédric Mbang Ondo (born 10 May 1990), is a Gabonese-French footballer who plays for Kórdrengir in the 2. deild karla. In 2017, he debuted with the Gabonese national football team.

Career

Club career
In 2010, Ondo signed with Grindavík of the Icelandic top-tier Úrvalsdeild karla. After appearing in 17 games for Grindavík during the 2010 season, he was loaned to BÍ/Bolungarvík for the 2011 season. Ondo returned to Grindavík for the 2012 season and appeared in 13 games, scoring 1 goal.

In February 2013, Ondo returned to BÍ/Bolungarvík and played there until 2016, appearing in 52 league games and scoring 5 goals. In April 2016, Ondo signed with 1. deild karla club Fjarðarbyggð. After one and a half seasons with Fjarðarbyggð, he transferred to Íþróttafélagið Grótta late in the 2017 season. In January 2018, Ondo signed with Afturelding. He appeared in 20 games during the 2018 season, helping Afturelding win the 2. deild karla and achieve promotion to the Inkasson league.

National team career
Ondo was selected for the Gabonese national football team ahead of its game against Guinea in March 2017.

Titles
2. deild karla
Winner: 2018

Personal life
Ondo is the older brother of Ulrick Brad Eneme Ella (https://en.m.wikipedia.org/wiki/Ulrick_Eneme_Ella) who is currently playing for Brighton. He is also the younger brother of Gabonese international Gilles Mbang Ondo.

References

External links
 
 

1990 births
Living people
Sportspeople from Rennes
People with acquired Gabonese citizenship
French sportspeople of Gabonese descent
Black French sportspeople
Association football defenders
French footballers
Gabonese footballers
Gabon international footballers
Grindavík men's football players
Vestri (football club) players
Grótta men's football players
Afturelding men's football players
Kórdrengir players
Gabonese expatriate footballers
French expatriate footballers
Expatriate footballers in Iceland
Gabonese expatriate sportspeople in Iceland